Addenbrooke's Charitable Trust (ACT; established 2005) is a charity based at Addenbrooke's Hospital and the Rosie Hospital, Cambridge, UK. Addenbrooke's Charitable Trust (ACT) registered charity number is 1048868.

References

External links
 

Health charities in the United Kingdom
Charities based in Cambridgeshire
Organizations established in 2005
2005 establishments in England